Clarendon County is a county located below the fall line in the Coastal Plain region of U.S. state of South Carolina. As of 2020 census, its population was 31,144. Its county seat is Manning.

This area was developed for lumber and mills, including textile mills. Clarendon County boasts one of the largest man-made lakes in the United States, Lake Marion, completed in 1941 as a New Deal project. It was planned as part of a national rural electrification initiative. Since the late 20th century, the dam's generation of hydroelectric power has also stimulated economic development and industry in the region.

The South Carolina state legislature established racial segregation of public facilities by state law in the late 19th century. During the Civil Rights Movement, Clarendon County was the site of the Briggs v. Elliott trial challenging segregation of public schools. This case was one of five combined with what came to be known as Brown v. Board of Education, under which the United States Supreme Court ruled in 1954 that racial segregation of public schools was unconstitutional.

History

Clarendon County was officially established in 1785, shortly after the American Revolutionary War, when the legislature divided Camden District into seven counties. One was Clarendon County. It was named after Edward Hyde, who was a Lord Proprietor and earl of Clarendon.

During the American Revolutionary War, the Battle of Half Way Swamp was fought in December 1780.  That was one of the many Revolutionary battles that took place in the area of Clarendon County. Others in this area were the following battles: Richbourg’s Mill, Nelson’s Ferry, Fort Watson/Santee Indian Mound, and Tearcoat. The Swamp Fox Murals Trail has been established as an historical landmark depicting the American Revolution and General Francis Marion, the "Swamp Fox".

The first European settlers in Clarendon County were ethnic French Huguenots, who traveled by boat up the Santee River. Their ancestors had earlier settled in Charleston after leaving France in the late 17th century to escape religious persecution. Transportation of goods by land was difficult, so canals were constructed to carry boat traffic around rapids in the river. The first notable canal was the Santee Canal, which was constructed in 1793. But due to the development of the railroads in the mid-1800s and construction linking major markets, the canal was superseded and ended operations some years later.

In 1798, the state legislature combined three counties - Clarendon, Claremont, and Salem - to form Sumter District for ease of administration. On December 19, 1855, a legislative act was passed establishing the Clarendon District, with the same boundaries as defined for the county in 1785. When implemented in 1787, an additional section from Sumter District was annexed – the northeast extension of Clarendon District. (The northernmost township was released to Florence County about 1888.)

During the antebellum period, the county was developed as large plantations to cultivate commodity crops, particularly short-staple cotton, by the labor of enslaved African Americans. Cultivation of this crop was made profitable by development of the cotton gin by Eli Whitney, which made processing more labor-efficient. By the time of the Civil War, the population of the county was majority black.

In 1855, Captain Joseph C. Burgess was selected to determine the geographical center of the county, the preferred location for the county seat, so that a courthouse village could be built. The commissioners decided on the site where the present courthouse was erected. Manning was developed as the county seat. Captain Burgess deeded six acres to the state, providing sites for the courthouse and jail, in addition to streets 75-feet-wide on four sides.

In 1865, toward the end of the American Civil War, a body of General Sherman's Union troops under command of General Potter raided Clarendon county. They destroyed a large portion of Manning, including the court house. The raid took place a few days before Gen. Robert E. Lee´s surrender at Appomattox. The county recovered slowly from the Civil War due to its reliance on agriculture, which suffered a long depression.

The State Constitution of 1868 renamed the districts as counties. Agriculture continued as the mainstay of the economy through much of the 19th century, and planters had to adjust to a free labor economy. They gradually relied on a system of mostly African-American tenant farmers and sharecroppers. Lumber and related mills and industries became increasingly important, with towns developed along railroad lines in the area.

Following Reconstruction, white Democrats regained control of the state legislature, passing laws for segregation of public facilities, Jim Crow and a new constitution of 1895 that effectively disfranchised most blacks in the state. This exclusion from the political system was not ended until after decades of activism by African Americans, who gained passage of federal civil rights legislation in the mid-1960s to enforce their constitutional rights.

In November 1941, Lake Marion was created as a reservoir by construction of the Santee Dam by the United States Corps of Engineers. The dam was built across the Santee River to generate hydroelectric power for rural electrification, one of the major infrastructure projects initiated under President Franklin D. Roosevelt's New Deal federal investments during the Great Depression. Lake Marion and the Santee Dam were part of the Santee-Cooper Hydroelectric and Navigation Project.

Two notable court cases in Clarendon County in the mid-20th century were part of challenges by the Civil Rights Movement to racial segregation of public facilities; these cases related to segregated public schools. This was concluded in law by the United States Supreme Court ruling in Brown v. Board of Education (1954), which declared that separate but equal schools were unconstitutional. The court learned that the separate school were historically underfunded in most Southern states and seldom equal. These cases were Levi Pearson v. Clarendon County Board of Education (1947), and Briggs v. Elliott (1952).

Geography

Clarendon Country is located in the east-central portion of South Carolina, inland of the Lowcountry and bordering the southern edge of the Pee Dee. The county covers 606.94 square miles; Lake Marion, located in the southern portion of the county, covers an additional 95 square miles of the county (See Map 2). Most of the land is predominantly sand and loamy soils. Clarendon County has a moderate climate with very warm summers and mild winters. The average precipitation is 55 inches per year. The growing season is 225 days, so farmers have a long season to grow crops. Some of the major crops grown in Clarendon County are cotton, tobacco, corn and soybean.

According to Core Based Statistical Classifications, Clarendon County is classified as a non-core area, and is neither a metropolitan or micropolitan statistical area.  As seen in Table 1, there are only 57.60 people per square mile in Clarendon County, significantly less than average in South Carolina, areas of which have been urbanized.

Clarendon County is characterized by a Humid subtropical climate with hot, humid summers and cool, dry winters. The county also holds the state's records for both maximum 24-hour snowfall and largest hailstone.

National protected areas
 Bluff Unit National Wildlife Refuge
 Pine Island Unit National Wildlife Refuge
 Santee National Wildlife Refuge

State and local protected areas/sites 
 Davis House
 Santee Indian Mound and Fort Watson
 Taw Caw Creek Park
 Woods Bay State Park (part)

Major water bodies 
 Black River
 Congaree River
 Cooper River
 Lake Marion
 Ox Swamp
 Pocotaligo River

Adjacent counties 
 Sumter County - north
 Florence County - northeast
 Williamsburg County - east
 Berkeley County - southeast
 Orangeburg County - southwest
 Calhoun County - west

Major highways
 
 
 
 
 
 
  (Alcolu 1)
  (Alcolu 2)

Demographics

2020 census

As of the 2020 United States Census, there were 31,144 people, 13,161 households, and 8,817 families residing in the county.

2010 census
As of the 2010 United States Census, there were 34,971 people, 13,132 households, and 9,238 families living in the county. The racial makeup of the county was 50.1% black or African American, 47.0% white, 0.6% Asian, 0.2% American Indian, 1.2% from other races, and 0.8% from two or more races. Those of Hispanic or Latino origin made up 2.6% of the population. In terms of ancestry, 12.2% were American, 6.8% were Irish, and 5.0% were English.

Of the 13,132 households, 31.7% had children under the age of 18 living with them, 45.1% were married couples living together, 20.6% had a female householder with no husband present, 29.7% were non-families, and 26.1% of all households were made up of individuals. The average household size was 2.54 and the average family size was 3.04. The median age was 41.4 years.

The median income for a household in the county was $33,066 and the median income for a family was $40,492. Males had a median income of $31,860 versus $26,851 for females. The per capita income for the county was $16,562. About 17.5% of families and 23.0% of the population were below the poverty line, including 36.3% of those under age 18 and 13.8% of those age 65 or over.

2000 census
As of the 2010 United States Census, there were 34,971 people living in the county. 50.4% were Black or African American, 44.0% White, 0.6% Asian, 0.2% Native American, 1.2% of some other race and 0.8% of two or more races. 2.6% were Hispanic or Latino (of any race).

The population has only slightly increased since 1920; only 20 percent compared to 71 percent for South Carolina. From 1920 to 1930 and from 1950 to 1970, there were significant declines in population, 16 percent and 26 percent, respectively. In part these declines reflected the Great Migration of African Americans out of the South, to seek better jobs, education and living opportunities.

As seen in the Table, the growing majority of the population of Clarendon County is Black or African American (50.4%). This reflects historic settlement patterns when the area had been developed for commodity agriculture and large plantations. In the 21st century, 27.9 percent of the State of South Carolina is Black or African; White or Caucasians comprise 45 percent of the population in Clarendon County and 60 percent in South Carolina, respectively.

In regard to education, 13.4% of the population had bachelor's degree, which is approximately 10% less than the state of South Carolina. There is a higher percentage of elderly, aged 65 and older, in Clarendon County in comparison to South Carolina, 17.6% and 14.1%, respectively. The population of Clarendon County is stationary in the area; more than 90% of the population has been living in the same house for at least a year.  The median household income is $33,355, approximately $10,000 less than the median for the State of South Carolina.

Government and politics
Clarendon County was once, like most of the Deep South, a Democratic stronghold at the beginning of the 20th century. The county became considerably more competitive following the end of World War II, with Republican candidate Dwight D. Eisenhower obtaining 68.5% in 1952, up from a mere 1% in 1948 for the Republican Party. However, after Jimmy Carter swept the Deep South and Clarendon in 1976, the county became a Democratic stronghold once again but by much narrower margins than at the beginning of the century, consistently hovering above the 50% marker by only a handful of digits until the 2020 election when Republican candidate Donald Trump became the first Republican candidate to win the county since Richard Nixon in 1972 by a narrow 111 vote margin.

Natural resources
Clarendon County has abundant ground-water resources of good quality. The Department of Natural Resources report on the ground-water resources in Clarendon suggests that the county is in a fortunate position for obtaining adequate water for domestic and public supplies, industry, and irrigation. Water is obtained chiefly from sand aquifers in the Black Creek and Middendorf Formations.

Quantities obtainable from wells are adequate for public supplies, industrial uses, and irrigation. Well yields as great as 1,500 gallons per minute are obtained, and many wells can produce more than 100 gallons per minute. The water is of good quality, being soft and low in mineral content. There are five public water-supply systems in Clarendon County. In 2008 the systems had the following pumpage rates, in millions of gallons per day:

Alcolu Water System—0.05
Barrineau Water System—0.09
Manning—1.07
Summerton—0.33
Turbeville—0.30

From boating, fishing, hiking and hunting, to golf on some of the world’s finest courses, Clarendon offers outdoor enthusiasts a buffet of things to do. The county is known for its championship-level catches of striped bass. Lake Marion is the site of several professional bass fishing tournaments, including the internationally known Citgo/Bassmasters Tournament and the Wal-Mart/FLW tour. Reader’s Digest magazine rated Lake Marion as one of “America’s 100 Best” for fishing and specifically pointed to the lake’s catfish.

Hunting is also a popular activity in Clarendon County, with deer, turkey and other small game available. or other small game animals. Several sporting clay operations and gun ranges are located throughout the county, as well as hunting preserves devoted to providing hunters a controlled environment.

Clarendon County has a wide range of hiking trails.

Media
 The Manning Times —publishes weekly on Thursday; founded in 1882. 
 The Clarendon Citizen news site is available online.

Culture
The Cultural Arts Center in Summerton and Weldon Auditorium in Manning present a diverse mix of cultural activities. These include plays, concerts by nationally renowned artists, and ballet performances, alongside a medley of local artists.

Communities

City
 Manning (county seat and largest city)

Towns
 Paxville
 Summerton
 Turbeville

Census-designated places
 Alcolu
 Foreston
 North Santee
 Wyboo

Unincorporated communities
 Davis Station
 Gable
 New Zion
 Rimini
 Sardinia
 Silver
 Wilson

Notable people
 Marie Deans (1940-2011) - Ant-death penalty activist
 Joseph Armstrong DeLaine (1898-1974) - Methodist pastor, principal and civil rights activist
 Althea Gibson (1927-2003) - first African-American woman to win a grand slam tennis title
 John C. Land III (1941-living) - long-serving South Carolina state senator (District 36; 1976-2013)
 John Lawrence Manning (1816-1889) - 65th Governor of South Carolina (1852-1854)
 Richard Irvine Manning I (1789-1836) - legislator and 50th Governor of South Carolina (1824-1826)
 Marian McKnight (1936-living) - Miss America 1957 & wife of actor Gary Conway
 Peggy Parish (1927-1988) - author of the Amelia Bedelia children's book series
 James Burchill Richardson (1770-1836) - 41st Governor of South Carolina (1802-1804)
 John Peter Richardson II (1801-1864) - legislator and 59th Governor of South Carolina (1840-1842)
 John Peter Richardson III (1831-1899) - legislator and 83rd Governor of South Carolina (1886-1890)
 Richard Richardson (1704-1780) - military brigadier general, enslaver and legislator
 George Junius Stinney Jr. (1929-1944) - the youngest American to be sentenced to death and executed. His conviction was overturned posthumously in 2014.
 Rob Thomas (1972-living) - lead singer (Matchbox 20)

See also
 List of counties in South Carolina
 National Register of Historic Places listings in Clarendon County, South Carolina
 South Carolina State Parks

References

External links

 
 
 Clarendon County History
 Clarendon County history and images

 
1785 establishments in South Carolina
Populated places established in 1785
Majority-minority counties in South Carolina